McFarland School District (MMSD) is a public school district headquartered in McFarland, Wisconsin. It serves the Village of McFarland, City of Madison, the towns of Dunn, Cottage Grove, and Pleasant Springs.

McFarland Schools

References

External links
McFarland School District

School districts in Wisconsin
Education in Dane County, Wisconsin